was a district located in Okayama Prefecture, Japan.

As of 2003, the district had an estimated population of 12,339 and a density of 45.47 persons per km2. The total area was 271.34 km2.

Towns and villages
 Bitchū
 Kawakami
 Nariwa

Merger
 On October 1, 2004 - the towns of Bitchū, Kawakami and Nariwa, along with the town of Ukan (from Jōbō District), were merged into the expanded city of Takahashi. Kawakami District was dissolved as a result of this merger.

Former districts of Okayama Prefecture